Oscar Peñas Cambray (born August 13, 1972) is a jazz composer-guitarist from Spain based in New York.

Biography
Oscar Peñas is a Catalan-American composer-guitarist born in Barcelona, Spain. In 2007, after completing his musical education at the New England Conservatory in Boston, Peñas moved to New York City.  At seventeen, he attended the Taller de Músics in Barcelona. In 1997 he enrolled at Berklee College of Music. At the same time, he led the Oscar Peñas Group (a.k.a. Astronautus). With this group, he recorded Astronautus (2003) and The Return of Astronautus (2005), both with the label Fresh Sound New Talent. In 2005 Peñas was awarded a scholarship and decided to earn his Master's in Jazz Studies at the New England Conservatory. He graduated in 2007. Afterward, Peñas moved to New York City. In November 2011, he self-produced and released his third album and first U.S. release, From Now On (BJU Records). Music of Departures and Returns, released in 2014, was his fourth album.

Discography
 Almadraba (Musikoz, 2022)
 Music of Departures and Returns (Musikoz, 2014)
 From Now On (Brooklyn Jazz Underground,  2011)
 The Return of Astronautus (Fresh Sound New Talent, 2005)
 Astronautus (Fresh Sound New Talent, 2003)

References

1972 births
Living people
Spanish jazz guitarists
Spanish male guitarists
21st-century guitarists
21st-century male musicians
Male jazz musicians